Club Africain is a Tunisian professional basketball club from Tunis. The club competes in the Championnat National A.

The team has won the national championship four times, the last time being in 2016. Notable players of the team include senior men's Tunisian national basketball team members Mourad El Mabrouk, Marouan Kechrid, Marouen Lahmar, and Naim Dhifallah.

History
The basketball section of Club Africain was established in 1956. The team entered the first-level Championnat National A in the 1979–80 season. Three years later, in 1982, the club won its first trophy when it captured the Tunisian Cup. Rival ES Radès was defeated in the final with a score of 86–71.

In 1999, a second Tunisian Cup was won after US Monastir was narrowly edged in the final, 72–69. Two years later, the third Cup was captured after beating Monastir again.

In 2004, Club Africain won its first Championnat National A championship, after defeating JS Kairouan in the final, 88–87. Naim Dhifallah scored a buzzer-beater with 0.9 seconds on the clock to bring the team its first national title.

Four years later, in 2008, Club Africain made its debut at the international stage when it played in the Zone 4 qualifiers for the 2008 FIBA Africa Clubs Champions Cup. In 2014, the team hosted the FIBA Africa Champions Cup and eventually captured the third place in the tournament.

Honours
 Tunisian League (4): 2003–04, 2013–14, 2014–15, 2015–16
 Tunisian Cup (6) : 1981–82, 1998–99, 2000–01, 2002–03, 2013–14, 2014–15
 Tunisian super Cup (3) : 2002–03, 2003–04, 2013–14
 Tunisian Federation Cup (4) : 1995, 1998, 2017, 2018

Players

Current roster

Coaches

See also
Club Africain (football)
Club Africain (handball)

References

External links
AfricaBasket.com Team Page
Club Africain on Instagram

Basketball teams established in 1956
Basketball teams in Tunisia
Basketball